The 2022 Paris–Roubaix Femmes (officially Paris–Roubaix Femmes avec Zwift) was a French road cycling one-day race that took place on 17 April 2022. It was the 2nd edition of Paris–Roubaix Femmes and the 8th event of the 2022 UCI Women's World Tour. The race was won by the Italian champion Elisa Longo Borghini, after a solo break with around 30 kilometres remaining, the second win by a long solo break in succession, after Lizzie Deignan's inaugural edition triumph in 2021.

Route 
The route used a near identical course to the first edition, with the only change being an additional starting circuit in Denain. The women covered the same final 17 sectors as the men's race.

Teams 
24 teams took part in the race. All 14 UCI Women's WorldTeams were automatically invited, and were joined by 10 UCI Women's Continental Teams. The three best 2021 UCI Women's Continental Teams (Ceratizit–WNT Pro Cycling, Parkhotel Valkenburg and Valcar–Travel & Service) received an automatic invitation, and the other seven teams were selected by Amaury Sport Organisation (ASO), the organisers of the race. 

UCI Women's WorldTeams

 
 
 
 
 
 
 
 
 
 
 
 
 
 

UCI Women's Continental Teams

 
 
 
 
 
 
 
 
 Cofidis Women Team
 St Michel–Auber93

Summary 
Prior to the race, Amaury Sport Organisation announced that the race would be sponsored by Zwift for the next 4 years, and that the prize money for the winner would be substantially increased from €1,535 to €20,000, following criticism of the disparity between the men's and women's races. 

2021 winner Lizzie Deignan did not defend her title, as she is taking off the 2022 season to look after her second child. Pre-race favourite Marianne Vos pulled out in the morning before the start after testing positive for COVID-19. Unlike the 2021 edition, the race was held in warm, sunny conditions in the traditional April slot in the calendar. 

During the race, Elisa Balsamo was disqualified, after the use of a 'sticky bottle' to return to the peloton following a puncture with 48km to go. With around 35km to go, a breakaway of Lotte Kopecky, Marta Bastianelli and Lucinda Brand was caught by the peloton. A counter attack by Elisa Longo Borghini of Trek–Segafredo on the Templeuve sector of Pavé allowed her to go clear, eventually gaining a gap of around 40 seconds. Although a small group of riders gave chase, Borghini made it to Roubaix alone, and was able to celebrate in the Roubaix Velodrome before crossing the line - the second win for the Trek-Segafredo team in the race. Kopecky won the sprint finish of the chasing group to take second place.

Result

References

External links 
 

Paris-Roubaix (women's race)
Paris-Roubaix (women's race)
Paris–Roubaix
Paris–Roubaix Femmes